Amiral Kabir Sayyid Mahmud Khan Barha, also known as Mahmud Khan, was a general in the Akbar's army, son of Sayyid Mubarak (also known as Makhan), was the first  person of this family - the Saiyids of Barah - to rise to the rank of a nobleman. This he did through his bravery and valour during the Timurid dynasty. He joined the service of Bairam Khan.

First year
In the first year of Akbar's reign and in the same year he was sent with Ali Quli Khan Shaibani to put down Hemu  who, after the defeat of Tardi Beg Khan, had out of pride collected a large force and started from Delhi and assume the title of Vikramadwitya. Sayyid  Mahmud was deployed in vanguard against Hemu and he fought valiantly and captured artillery of Hemu which he had sent to the battlefield in advance at Panipat Ali Quli Khan and Sayyed Mahmud Khan won the battle of Panipat before Akbar and Bairam Khan reached the battlefield of Panipat.

Second year
In the 2nd regnal year 964 Hijri corresponding to 1557 CE he was appointed to chastise Haji Khan, a slave of Sher Shah Suri, who had taken possession of Ajmer and Nagaur (present day Rajasthan), and was showing signs of rebellion. In the third year he was deputed to capture the fort of Jitaran in Jodhpur, which he won from the Rajputs. When Bairam Khan's affairs were upset, he joined the king’s service, and received Pargana of Sarwat (present-day Muzaffarnagar) as a fiefdom in Doab of the Ganges-Yamuna.

Seventh year
In the seventh year on 16 May 1562 Adham Khan Koka, younger son of Maham Anga, overwhelmed with envy over Shams-ud-Din Ataga Khan, murdered Shams-ud-Din Ataga. Mun'im Khan who had secretly instigated the crime, became panic stricken and attempted to flee to Kabul. En route to Kabul, when he was passing through the fief of Sayyid Mahmud Khan Barha at Sawat present day Muzaffar Nagar, Mun'im Khan was captured by his men. Sayyid Mahmud Khan recognized him and took him back to the royal threshold with honour. Emperor Akbar pardoned him at the intercession of Mahmud Khan Barha. In the seventeenth year of Akbar's reign he went to Gujarat in attendance on Khan Kalan. Later, he was sent in pursue of Ibrahim Hussain Mirza.

Afterwards when the emperor turned his persona attention to this affair, and immediately recalled the officers who  had been sent, Mahmud Khan swiftly joined the emperor Akbar near Sarnal, a town in Gujarat, and distinguished himself. When the Mirza was defeated and retreated towards Agra, he with other officers was appointed to pursue him.

Eighteenth year
In the eighteenth year of Akbar's reign he was sent in advance with a number of officers to Gujarat, and when the emperor during his march reached Mirtha near Jodhpur, Rajasthan he joined the royal party. In the battle with Muhammad Hussain he and a few men formed the reserve, Sayid Mahmud took his place with a number of officers in the centre, and during the conflict advanced courageously beyond the centre, and fought bravely. In the end of the same year he with other Barha Saiyids and Saiyids of Amroha led an expedition against the territory of Madhukar Bundela of Orchha in Bundelkhand and conquered it. Sayyed Mahmud was a straightforward and outspoken  man and it is stated in history books  that when Akbar deputed him against Madhukar Bundela and he returned victorious, after performing outstanding deeds of valour, he reported to the Emperor that he performed such and such deeds of valour Asaf Khan remarked "Miranji! This victory was due to the Iqbal-e-shah" (glory or good fortune of King), he replied "Why do you tell untruth? Iqbal-e-shah was not there, it was I and my brothers who wielded two-handed swords there". The king smiled and favoured him with the gifts of all kind and he was granted a Standard and Drums, a great honor.

Death
He died on 2 October 1573 and is buried at his ancestral place Mujhera in  Muzaffarnagar district. His rank was four thousand personal (Zat) and two thousand horse (sawar). He had six sons Sayyid Hashim, Sayyid Qasim, Sayyid Alim, Sayyid Salim, Sayyid Jahangir, and Sayyid Ali Asghar styled Saif Khan Barha. All of his sons became prominent in Akbar and Jahangir's reign and were Mansabdar.

References

Mughal generals
1573 deaths
Twelvers
Year of birth unknown
16th-century soldiers
Indian Shia Muslims
16th-century Indian Muslims
16th-century Indian politicians